"Save That Shit" is a song by American rapper Lil Peep from his first studio album, Come Over When You're Sober, Pt. 1 (2017). It was released as the fourth single from the album on August 12, 2017. The track was produced by Smokeasac and IIVI, and written by the artist himself, George Astasio, Jason Pebworth, Jon Shave, Michael Blackburn and Juan Alderete de la Peña. The song is Lil Peep's sixth highest charting single in the United States, peaking at number nine on the Billboard Bubbling Under R&B/Hip-Hop Singles chart following his death on November 15, 2017.

Critical reception
Mitch Findlay of HotNewHipHop gave the song a positive review, recommending readers to check the song out."

Chart performance
In the United States, following Lil Peep's death, "Save That Shit" debuted at number nine on the Billboard Bubbling Under R&B/Hip-Hop Singles chart in the week beginning December 9, 2017, becoming Lil Peep's second highest-charting song in the country. The song later fell off the chart, in the following week.

In Canada, the song debuted at number 97 on the Canadian Hot 100 alongside "Awful Things", in the week beginning December 9, 2017, where it became Lil Peep's second highest-charting song in the country. It later dropped off the chart the following week beginning on December 16, 2017.

Music video
The music video for "Save That Shit" premiered posthumously on December 19, 2017. It was directed by Mezzy and Heavy Rayn. It has surpassed 250 million views on YouTube as of February 2020. A large increase , sitting at 383 million views as of July 2020.

Charts

Certifications

References

External links
 

2017 songs
2017 singles
Lil Peep songs
Songs written by George Astasio
Songs written by Jason Pebworth
Songs written by Jon Shave
Songs written by Lil Peep